The 1992 NCAA Division I Field Hockey Championship was the 12th women's collegiate field hockey tournament organized by the National Collegiate Athletic Association, to determine the top college field hockey team in the United States. The Old Dominion Lady Monarchs won their seventh championship, defeating the Iowa Hawkeyes in the final The championship rounds were held at Cary Street Field in Richmond, Virginia on the campus of Virginia Commonwealth University (VCU).

Bracket

References 

1992
Field Hockey
1992 in women's field hockey
1992 in sports in Virginia
Women's sports in Virginia